Dubravko Pavličić (28 November 1967 – 4 April 2012) was a Croatian footballer who played as a central defender.

Club career
Born in Zagreb, Socialist Republic of Croatia, Socialist Federal Republic of Yugoslavia, Pavličić started playing professionally for local NK Dinamo, being irregularly used over the course of three seasons. He developed into a top division player with NK Rijeka, helping it to two sixth-place finishes and one fourth in the newly founded Croatian First Football League; in the 1993–94 Croatian Cup, he scored the game's only goal in the second leg of the final, albeit in an eventual 1–2 aggregate loss.

In the 1994 summer Pavličić moved to Spain and signed for Hércules CF, in Segunda División, winning promotion to La Liga in his second year and netting a career-best six goals in 38 games in the following season, which nonetheless ended in relegation, with the player scoring in both games against FC Barcelona (3–2 win at the Camp Nou and 2–1 success at home). He stayed in the top level with UD Salamanca, dropping down a division in 1999.

In the 2000 off-season, 32-year-old Pavličić signed for Racing de Ferrol – division two – retiring at the end of the campaign. He settled in the nation subsequently, also playing amateur football for club Sporting Plaza in the Alicante area.

International career
Pavličić played for Croatia for five years, gaining a total of 22 caps. His debut came on 8 July 1992 in a 1–3 friendly loss with Australia in Adelaide, and he was selected for the squad that appeared at UEFA Euro 1996, playing two group stage games (one minute against Turkey, full match against Portugal) in an eventual quarter final exit. His final international was a June 1997 Kirin Cup match against Turkey.

Previously, Pavličić was a member of the highly talented Yugoslavia under-20 team that won the 1987 FIFA World Youth Championship in Chile, playing all the games in the tournament.

Death
Pavličić died of pancreatic cancer on 4 April 2012 in Elche, aged 44.

Career statistics

Club statistics

International

International appearances

Honours
Hércules CF
Segunda División: 1995–96

Yugoslavia U-20
FIFA World Youth Championship: 1987

References

External links

1967 births
2012 deaths
Footballers from Zagreb
Association football central defenders
Yugoslav footballers
Croatian footballers
Croatia international footballers
UEFA Euro 1996 players
GNK Dinamo Zagreb players
HNK Rijeka players
Hércules CF players
UD Salamanca players
Racing de Ferrol footballers
Yugoslav First League players
Croatian Football League players
La Liga players
Segunda División players
Croatian expatriate footballers
Expatriate footballers in Spain
Croatian expatriate sportspeople in Spain
Deaths from pancreatic cancer
Deaths from cancer in Spain